Ertil is the name of several inhabited localities in Russia.

Urban localities
Ertil, Voronezh Oblast, a town in Ertilsky District, Voronezh Oblast

Rural localities
Ertil, Tambov Oblast, a village in Troitskoroslyaysky Selsoviet of Tokaryovsky District of Tambov Oblast